The Château de la Grande Filolie is a château in Saint-Amand-de-Coly, Dordogne, Nouvelle-Aquitaine, France.

Châteaux in Dordogne
Monuments historiques of Dordogne